George Ernest (born George Ruud Hjorth; November 20, 1921 – June 25, 2009) was an American actor and Office of Strategic Services (OSS) combat photographer/cameraman during World War II.  He appeared in more than 60 films between 1930 and 1942.

Early life
Ernest was born George Ruud Hjorth to a Norwegian mother and Danish father. The family moved to California when he was two-and-a-half years old. His father owned a restaurant in Hollywood.

Acting career
Ernest began getting small parts in silent films when he was just three years old. He had a successful career as a child actor, being a member of Our Gang in 1931. He also played Roger Jones in 17 Jones Family low-budget films from 1936 to 1940 (named Roger Evers in the first movie, Every Saturday Night). However, as he grew older, roles became scarcer, so he learned from cameramen on his films and became one himself.

World War II
When the Japanese attacked Pearl Harbor on December 7, 1941, and the United States entered World War II, he enlisted. At a friend's suggestion, he became a combat photographer and "one of the 17 original movie makers" of a special OSS photographic unit headed by noted film director John Ford. He had to sign an agreement not to discuss his wartime work for 50 years.

On his first combat mission, he photographed the fighting in North Africa, followed by the invasion of Sicily and then on to the Italian mainland. He parachuted "into France and Germany ... to take pictures of bridges, roads, rivers, railroads and even a V-1 launch site".

In early June 1944, he parachuted into occupied France with three film cameras without being told what he was supposed to do. The French Resistance hid him for a couple of days, then took him to the coast before dawn of June 6. He was told he would know what to film. As dawn came up, he witnessed, and filmed, the D-Day invasion of Omaha Beach by the United States Army - the only known Allied footage from the German perspective. After using up all of his film, he managed to get through the American lines unharmed and returned to England. Absurdly, when the film was to be screened, he was ordered out of the room because he did not have the top secret clearance required to see it. The whereabouts of the film are currently unknown.

Hjorth also shot pictures of Buchenwald concentration camp and the aftermath of an Axis atrocity in France (the corpses of dozens of civilians burned alive).

Post-war
He became an executive for McDonnell Douglas. When OSS files became declassified, his wartime activities came to light. Historians are searching for the film he shot, so far without success. He died on June 25, 2009, in Whittier, California.

He was one of the subjects in two documentaries - The Our Gang Story (1994) and Shooting War (2000), about World War II combat cameramen - and episode 9 of the TV series Brad Meltzer's Lost History.

Partial filmography

 Sunny Side Up (1929) - Little Boy (uncredited)
 Along Came Youth (1930) - Neetsfoot Boy
 Men on Call (1930) - Little Boy (uncredited)
 Fly My Kite (1931, Short) - Georgie (as Hal Roach's Rascals)
 The Star Witness (1931) - Donny Leeds
 Shiver My Timbers (1931, Our Gang short) - Georgie (as Hal Roach's Rascals)
 The Deadline (1931) - Jimmy
 Union Depot (1932) - Eight-Year-Old Boy (uncredited)
 Fireman, Save My Child (1932) - Team Mascot (uncredited)
 Destry Rides Again (1932) - Willie
 Love Is a Racket (1932) - Newsboy (uncredited)
 The Fourth Horseman (1932) - Boy with Firecrackers (uncredited)
 Speed Demon (1932) - Catfish Jones
 Handle with Care (1932) - Charlie
 The Chief (1937) - Boy at Circus (uncredited)
 Girl Without a Room (1933) - Child (uncredited)
 Beloved (1934) - Eric, as a Boy
 The Human Side (1934) - Tom Sheldon
 Music in the Air (1934) - Boy (uncredited)
 Little Men (1934) - Emil
 Diamond Jim (1935) - Sullivan (the Boy) (uncredited)
 Dinky (1935) - Jojo
 Racing Luck (1935) - Jimmy Curtis
 Straight from the Heart (1935) - Neighbor Boy (uncredited)
 The Glass Key (1935) - Boy (uncredited)
 The Mystery of Edwin Drood (1935) - Deputy
 The Perfect Tribute (1935) - Boy, wounded soldier's kid brother (uncredited)
 Man Hunt (1936) - Jackie
 The Trail of the Lonesome Pine (1936) - Dave at age 10 (uncredited)
 Song of the Saddle (1936) - Little Frankie
 Every Saturday Night (1936) - Roger Evers
 Too Many Parents (1936) - Phillip Stewart
 Educating Father (1936) - Roger Jones
 Back to Nature (1936) - Roger Jones
 The Plainsman (1936) - A Boy
 Reunion (1936) - Rusty
 Off to the Races (1937) - Roger Jones
 Let's Get Married (1937) - Billy Norris (uncredited)
 Motor Madness (1937) - 'Pancho', Runaway Kid
 The Jones Family in Big Business (1937) - Roger Jones
 Wife, Doctor and Nurse (1937) - Red
 Hot Water (1937) - Roger Jones
 Borrowing Trouble (1937) - Roger Jones
 Lady Behave! (1937) - Hank Cormack
 Paradise for Three (1938) - Office Boy (uncredited)
 Love on a Budget (1938) - Roger Jones
 A Trip to Paris (1938) - Roger Jones
 Safety in Numbers (1938) - Roger Jones
 Down on the Farm (1938) - Roger Jones
 Sweethearts (1938) - Bobby - First Call Boy (uncredited)
 Everybody's Baby (1939) - Roger Jones
 Boy Friend (1939) - Billy Bradley
 The Jones Family in Hollywood (1939) - Roger Jones
 Quick Millions (1939) - Roger Jones
 20,000 Men a Year (1939) - Skip Rogers
 Too Busy to Work (1939) - Roger Jones
 Young as You Feel (1940) - Roger Jones
 On Their Own (1940) - Roger Jones
 Four Sons (1940) - Fritz
 Golden Gloves (1940) - Joey Parker
 Meet the Missus (1940) - Sidney Higgins
 Petticoat Politics (1941) - Sidney Higgins
 Mountain Moonlight (1941) - Johnny Weaver
 Remember the Day (1941) - Bill Tower
 Stardust on the Sage (1942) - Curly

References

Bibliography

 Holmstrom, John (1996). The Moving Picture Boy: An International Encyclopaedia from 1895 to 1995. Norwich: Michael Russell, p. 108-109.

External links

1921 births
2009 deaths
20th-century American male actors
American male child actors
American male film actors
United States Army personnel of World War II
Male actors from Massachusetts
People of the Office of Strategic Services
People from Pittsfield, Massachusetts
American war photographers
World War II photographers